Jacinter Shikanda (born 14 July 1986) is a female sprinter from Kenya. She competed in the women's 400m at the 2014 Commonwealth Games. She also competed in the Women's 400 metres event at the 2015 World Championships in Athletics in Beijing but was disqualified in her heat.

Her personal best in the event is 52.29 set in Nairobi in 2015.

International competitions

References

External links

Kenyan female sprinters
Living people
1986 births
World Athletics Championships athletes for Kenya
Athletes (track and field) at the 2014 Commonwealth Games
Commonwealth Games competitors for Kenya
People from Western Province (Kenya)